Gigantidas is a genus of large, deepwater, hydrothermal vent mussels, marine bivalve molluscs in the family Mytilidae.

Distribution and habitat
Species in this genus are found on deep-sea hydrothermal vents on the southern Kermadec Ridge. These mussels form dense beds at these sites.

Description
The shells of Gigantidas gladius are up to 30 cm long.

Species
Species within the genus Gigantidas include:
 Gigantidas coseli Saether, Little, Campbell, Marshall, Collins & Alfaro, 2010
 Gigantidas gladius Cosel & Marshall, 2003
 Gigantidas horikoshi Hashimoto & Yamane, 2005
 Gigantidas samario Cosel & Gracia, 2018
 Gigantidas taiwanensis (Cosel, 2008) 
 Gigantidas tangaroa (Cosel & B. A. Marshall, 2003)

References

 Cosel R.von & Marshall B.A. 2003. Two new species of large mussels (Bivalvia: Mytilidae) from active submarine volcanoes and a cold seep off the eastern North Island of New Zealand, with description of a new genus. The Nautilus 117(2): 31-46

External links
 hubaut, J., Puillandre, N., Faure, B., Cruaud, C. & Samadi, S. (2013). The contrasted evolutionary fates of deep-sea chemosynthetic mussels (Bivalvia, Bathymodiolinae). Ecology and Evolution

 
Bivalve genera